Laurent Tessier (15 September 1927 – 5 February 2012) was a Canadian cyclist. He competed in three events at the 1948 Summer Olympics.

References

External links
 

1927 births
2012 deaths
Canadian male cyclists
Olympic cyclists of Canada
Cyclists at the 1948 Summer Olympics
Cyclists from Montreal